Lobelia anatina, commonly known as Apache lobelia or south western lobelia, is a small herbaceous plant in the family Campanulaceae native to North America.

The herb is found only in the south west of North America.

References

anatina
Flora of North America